Robin James Rubick (born September 27, 1960) is a former American football tight end who played professionally in the National Football League (NFL) for the Detroit Lions from 1982 to 1988. He played college football at Grand Valley State University. Rubick was drafted in 12 round of the 1982 NFL Draft by the Lions.

As an NFL player Rubick played in 88 games, had 4 touchdowns (3 receiving, 1 rushing), 44 receptions, and 1 carry.

From 1999 to 2007, he served as the Detroit Lions studio analyst on the Detroit Sports Report, and later on Lions Live, on Fox Sports Detroit. Rubick was the radio color commentator for EMU football on WEMU from 2004 to 2010. After leaving professional football, Rubick received master's degrees from Eastern Michigan University and Marygrove College and currently works as a physical education and health teacher at Zemmer Middle School in Lapeer, Michigan. In 2010, he became the color commentator for preseason games on the Detroit Lions Television Network.

Rubick frequently participates in charity basketball games with other former and current Lions players, often against volunteer firefighters to help raise money for local communities around Michigan.

References

1960 births
Living people
American football tight ends
Detroit Lions announcers
Detroit Lions players
Eastern Michigan University alumni
Grand Valley State Lakers football players
Marygrove College alumni
National Football League announcers
People from Newberry, Michigan
Players of American football from Michigan